Megastomia simplex, common name the simple pyramid shell,  is a species of sea snail, a marine gastropod mollusk in the family Pyramidellidae, the pyrams and their allies.

Description
The white, rather solid shell has a smooth appearance. The length of the shell measures . The teleoconch contains 7½ rather flat whorls . They are a little angulated at the suture. The aperture is lirate within. Its plait is sharp and transverse.

Distribution
The type specimen of this marine species was found off Port Jackson, New South Wales, Australia.

References

External links

Pyramidellidae
Gastropods described in 1871